Saddam Afridi is a Pakistani cricketer. He made his first-class debut for Federally Administered Tribal Areas in the 2017–18 Quaid-e-Azam Trophy on 26 September 2017. He made his List A debut for Multan in the 2018–19 Quaid-e-Azam One Day Cup on 6 September 2018.

References

External links
 

Year of birth missing (living people)
Living people
Pakistani cricketers
Place of birth missing (living people)
Federally Administered Tribal Areas cricketers
Multan cricketers